The 1926 All-Ireland Senior Football Championship was the 40th staging of Ireland's premier Gaelic football knock-out competition. The All Ireland semi final between Kildare ended Galway's All Ireland title. Kerry were the winners.

Results

Connacht Senior Football Championship

Leinster Senior Football Championship

Munster Senior Football Championship  

There was not time for a replay so Tipperary advanced.

Ulster Senior Football Championship

All-Ireland Senior Football Championship

Championship statistics

Miscellaneous

 The Limerick vs Tipperary game ended in a draw but didn't go to a replay. Tipperary decided to qualify for Munster final.

References

All-Ireland Senior Football Championship